This is a list of Representatives elected to the House of Representatives of Japan at the 2017 general election, held on 22 October 2017, for the Forty-Eight election period of the House of Representatives beginning with the 184th session of the National Diet of Japan.

Terms
(as of July 2019)

Composition

Representatives

References

General elections in Japan